Targeting pods (TGP) are target designation tools used by attack aircraft for identifying targets and guiding precision-guided munition (PGM) such as laser-guided bombs to those targets. The first targeting pods were developed in conjunction with the earliest generation of PGMs in the mid-1960s.

Categories

Laser designators

The design of laser-guided bombs requires a "laser spot tracker" that locates reflected pulsed laser light from a designated target. This enables an aircraft's targeting system to home in on that specific target. The simplest spot trackers, such as the Pave Penny pod, have no laser at all, just a laser sensor.

Some targeting systems incorporate a laser rangefinder, a laser beam that can calculate the precise range to a target and communicate that information to the nav/attack system. Many targeting pods or installations use the same sensor as the laser spot tracker to receive the reflected rangefinder signal, so they can perform both ranging and tracking. These are called laser ranger and marked target seeker (LRMTS).

Some targeting systems have a laser that can designate a target for laser-guided munitions, enabling the aircraft to designate its own targets or designate for other friendly units. LRMTS installations (particularly fixed internal units) of the 1970s often did not have a laser of sufficient power and slant range to designate targets, although they could provide rangefinding. Such units required targets to be designated by a ground designator or forward air controller in another aircraft.

Electro-optics

The basic electro-optical (EO) sensor is essentially a closed-circuit television camera, usually with a magnification lens, helping the aircrew to locate and identify targets. For night and adverse weather use, many EO sensors incorporate low-light light-amplification systems. Some pods supplement the basic visual EO with forward-looking infra-red (FLIR) to aid in locating and identifying targets in darkness. Such systems are sometimes called infrared search and track sensors. Aselpod is one of the example of such systems produced by the Aselsan.

Radar
Some pods may contain a small radar set for targeting and navigation, particularly for aircraft that have no search radar. Such a system, for example, was developed for the unsuccessful N/AW (Night/Adverse Weather) version of the USAF A-10 Thunderbolt II. Currently, laser and infrared systems are more common than radar because they are less easily detected by adversaries, providing less warning to the target. Lasers can also provide more accurate ranging data for aerial gunnery.

List of targeting pods

Laser spot tracker pods

 AN/AVQ-11 Pave Sword
 AN/AVQ-14 Pave Arrow
 AN/AAS-35(V) Pave Penny

Laser designator pods

 ATLIS
 ATLIS II
 K/PZS-01
 Loong Eye I
 Loong Eye II
 OC2
 OC5
 AN/AVQ-10 Pave Knife
 AN/AVQ-16 Pave Track
 AN/AVQ-23 Pave Spike
 AN/ASQ-153 Pave Spike

FLIR pods

 Blue Sky navigation pod

FLIR and laser designator pods

 AN/ASQ-137
 AN/ASQ-228 ATFLIR
 ASELPOD
 AUEODS
 FILAT
 K/JDC-01
 AN/AAQ-14 LANTIRN
 AN/AAQ-28(V) LITENING
 AN/AAS-38 Nite Hawk
 AN/AAQ-33 Sniper XR
 AN/AVQ-26 Pave Tack
 PDLCT
 STS-55
 STS-56
 Thales Damoclès
 Thales TALIOS
 TIALD
 TX-S55
 TX-S56
 WMD-7
 UOMZ Sapsan-E
 T220/E
 YINGS-III
 T220

Radar homing pods
 AN/ASQ-213

See also
 Guidance system
 Laser sight (firearms)
 List of laser articles
 List of military electronics of the United States
 AN/PEQ-1 SOFLAM

References

External links

 
Targeting (warfare)